The 1986 Volvo Tennis Chicago was a men's tennis tournament played on indoor carpet courts at the UIC Pavilion in Chicago, Illinois in the United States that was part of the 1986 Nabisco Grand Prix. It was the second edition of the tournament and was held from March 24 through March 30, 1986. Third-seeded Boris Becker, who entered on a wildcard, won the singles title.

Finals

Singles
 Boris Becker defeated  Ivan Lendl 7–6, 6–3
 It was Becker's 1st singles title of the year and the 4th of his career.

Doubles
 Ken Flach /  Robert Seguso defeated  Eddie Edwards /  Francisco González 6–0, 7–5

References

External links
 ITF tournament edition details

Volvo Tennis Chicago
Volvo Tennis Chicago
Volvo Tennis Chicago
Volvo Tennis Chicago